This is a list of the National Register of Historic Places listings in Palo Pinto County, Texas it is intended to be a complete list of properties listed on the National Register of Historic Places in Palo Pinto County, Texas. Nine properties are listed on the National Register in the county. One property is also a Recorded Texas Historic Landmark.

Current listings

The locations of National Register properties may be seen in a mapping service provided.

|}

See also

National Register of Historic Places listings in Texas
Recorded Texas Historic Landmarks in Palo Pinto County

References

External links

 
Palo Pinto County